The 2018–19 Círculo Gijón season was their second in existence and their debut in professional basketball, after achieving one of the vacant places in LEB Plata, third division, after the expansion. The club was called TeslaCard Círculo Gijón for sponsorship reasons.

Overview

Pre-season
After failing to promote to Liga EBA in the club's first season, Círculo Gijón achieved one of the eight places created after the expansion of the LEB Plata from 16 to 24 teams.

Despite the sporting failure, Nacho Galán, owner, decided to continue as head coach and only former NBA player Robert Swift and Junior Johnson continued in the club. With the aim to promote Asturian players, Círculo Gijón signed four of them: former ACB and EuroLeague player Saúl Blanco, former LEB Plata Javier Menéndez, Alejandro Rubiera from local Liga EBA team Gijón Basket and Ángel Moro, who played two years ago also at Gijón Basket.

First stage
On 6 October 2018, Círculo Gijón beat Ávila Auténtica Carrefour "El Bulevar" in their debut in the professional basketball by 75–67. Four days later, the team lost their first match by wasting the work made in the first half against Quesería La Antigua CB Tormes with a disastrous third quarter, lost by 8–25. Osayande was the best player by performing 18 points and 12 rebounds and Nelson Yengue made his debut with the team. The week ended with the first home loss, against Basket Navarra Club. Despite winning the first quarter by 16 points, with nine three-points shots made, Navarra won the match thanks to a shot of Carles Marzo with only nine-tenths of a second left.

The bad streak continued on 21 October, at Azpeitia, with a 74–72 loss against Juaristi ISB after an overtime. With this third loss, Círculo Gijón was dropped to the last position of the Group West.

On 12 December, Círculo Gijón announced the come back of former Gijón Baloncesto point guard Rubén Suárez, that played with the club in the previous season. Subsequently, Junior Johnson was waived. In his first match, Círculo Gijón beat Quesería La Antigua CB Tormes by 78–66, continuing the team's good streak at home, with three consecutive wins. On 30 December, Círculo Gijón lost in the last second against Juaristi ISB in a match where point guard Ángel Moro was injured for the rest of the season. This was the first match of South African Pieter Prinsloo that, despite being signed in August, could not play with the club due to bureaucratic problems.

On 19 January, Círculo Gijón lost a very controversial home match against Aquimisa Laboratorios Queso Zamorano. After being losing by 14 points at the end of the third quarter, the Geometrics took the lead of the game when, with 1:30 left, Saúl Blanco was disqualified as being called an unsportsmanlike foul to him and a technical foul to Zamora player Anthony Libroia, thus meaning the visitors having one more free shot and recovering the possession.

One week later, despite losing at Bodegas Rioja Vega, Shane Osayande was named MVP of the week with a Performance Index Rating of 30.

Círculo Gijón ended the first stage with three consecutive wins for reaching the ninth position with nine wins and 13 losses. The club would start the group for avoiding the relegation with six wins and four losses.

Second stage
Círculo Gijón started the second stage with a huge home win against Arcos Albacete Basket by 79–62. Osayande, with 19 points 20 rebounds and four blocks, was chosen MVP of the week. However, the injury of Saúl Blanco, which only played a couple of minutes in the win against Albacete, dropped the team to the relegation positions after six consecutive losses.

Point guard Davy Baltus was fired in the week previous to the match of the seventh round against Torrons Vicens CB L'Hospitalet, that meant the come back of Saúl Blanco and a new win by beating the Catalans by a huge 86–52. However, despite winning four of the last five games, Círculo Gijón could not avoid relegation.

Saúl Blanco was named member of the team of the season.

Players

Squad information

In
From the previous season, only Robert Swift and Junior Johnson continued in the club. Rubén Suárez came back during the season after his retirement.

|}

Out
As a result of promoting two divisions, Círculo Gijón changed all its roster before the season. During the season, Davy Baltus was fired due to disciplinary issues.

|}

Club

Technical staff

Pre-season and friendlies

LEB Plata

First stage

League table (Group West)

Results summary

Results by round

Matches

Second stage

League table (Group A2)

Results summary

Results by round

Matches

Statistics

Source: FEB.es

References

External links
 Official website
 LEB Plata and Círculo Gijón roster at Asturcesto

Circulo
Círculo Gijón seasons